"Past the Mission" is a song by American singer-songwriter and musician Tori Amos. It was released as the third single from her second studio album, Under the Pink, in Europe, Australia, and North America but was the fourth release worldwide, due to a varied released schedule in different countries. "Past the Mission" was issued in May 1994 by EastWest Records in the UK, in July 1994 in Australia, and in September 1994 by Atlantic Records in North America. Two different CD singles containing live B-sides were released in the UK, and the second of these was released in continental Europe and Australia. In the US, the single was only released commercially on cassette, although a promotional CD single was produced.

Background
Regarding the origins of the song, Amos commented: 

Trent Reznor, founder of the industrial rock group Nine Inch Nails, sings background vocals on this track. An alternate mix of "Past the Mission" appears on Amos' compilation box set A Piano: The Collection (2006).

Chart performance
"Past the Mission" reached the top 40 in both the UK and Ireland, but it failed to chart on the US Hot 100 and peaked outside the top 100 in Australia.

Music video
The video begins with Tori holding hands with two young women, walking along a dirt road. As the three begin walking through a town, other women join them in their march until there is a large parade as the men look on. The women are eventually confronted by a male priest, who blocks their pathway. One by one the women move to the ground, laying flat as the priest walks around and steps over them.  The priest is then joined by the rest of the men, who all walk away as the women stand up and continue their march, eventually finding themselves in the open field seen at the beginning of the video. The video ends with a young boy running to catch up with the ever advancing parade of women.

Track listings
The UK CD single set was sold in two parts. The non-limited part (CD 2) comes in a slim jewel case and the disc features a photo-negative image of Amos playing a piano. The limited edition (CD 1) comes in a triple gatefold digipak case with two slots to house each CD in the set. In place of the second disc there is a cardboard cutout that looks like the CD. The owner can replace the cutout with the actual CD from the other half of the set. The second CD was also released in Germany and looks nearly identical excepting that the image on the disc is a positive image, not photo-negative.

UK limited-edition CD single
 "Upside Down" (live) – 5:57
 "Past the Mission" (live) – 4:21
 "Icicle" (live) – 7:50
 "Flying Dutchman" (live) – 6:31

UK CD single 2; German and Australian CD
 "Past the Mission" (LP edition) – 4:05
 "Winter" (live) – 6:37
 "The Waitress" (live) – 3:29
 "Here. In My Head" (live) – 6:05

UK 7-inch single; UK, German, and Australian cassette single
 "Past the Mission" (LP edition) 
 "Past the Mission" (live in Chicago March 1994)

US cassette single
 "Past the Mission" – 4:05
 "Black Swan" – 4:04

Charts

Release history

References

Tori Amos songs
1993 songs
1994 singles
Atlantic Records singles
East West Records singles
Music videos directed by Jake Scott (director)
Songs written by Tori Amos